Brynmawr Rugby Football Club are a Welsh rugby union club based in Brynmawr in South Wales. The club presently plays in the Welsh Rugby Union Division One East league and is a feeder club for the Newport Gwent Dragons.

In 2002 Brynmawr RFC, along with Abertillery RFC, withdrew from the Principality Cup, after the Welsh Rugby Union made an error during the live draw for the fifth round.
In 2013 Brynmawr were able to field an Under 13s team. That team stayed together through the remaining years of Junior Rugby and on 30 April 2017 they won the famous Provins International Tournament in France - the first Welsh Team to lift the trophy. They went through the tournament without conceding a point.

Club honours
1994–95 Welsh League Division 7 East - Champions
2007–08 WRU Division Three East - Champions

Notable players
See also :Category:Brynmawr RFC players
William Evans
Roy Francis
Damien Hudd
Sam Cross
Stupid Lee

References 

Welsh rugby union teams